Appa Rao Podile is an Indian scientist, educator and former Vice-Chancellor of the University of Hyderabad. He was awarded the Millennium Plaques of Honour for his achievements in Life Sciences by the Prime Minister of India Narendra Modi in 2017.

Education
Podile obtained his MSc, and then completed his Ph.D. in 1987 from the Sardar Patel University in Gujarat. He was a postdoctoral fellow (1998) of the Institute of Botany, Academia Sinica, Taipei, Taiwan and subsequently was a visiting scientist (2000), at the Institute of Molecular Biology, Academia Sinica. Podile also completed a postdoctoral fellowship at the Department of Plant Biochemistry and Biotechnology, University of Münster, Germany in 2006.
In 2015, he became the vice-chancellor of the University of Hyderabad.

Awards and recognition
 Fellow, Indian National Science Academy, New Delhi 2017
 Millennium Plaques of Honour, Indian Science Congress Association, Jan 2017 (presented by Prime Minister of India)
 President Elect, Association of Microbiologists of India, 2017
 Elected Fellow, National Academy of Agricultural Sciences, 2012
 Tata Innovation Fellowship, Department of Biotechnology, April 2014
 Fellow, Indian Academy of Sciences, Jan 2014

References

1960 births
Living people
Indian academic administrators
Indian educators
Indian scientists
People from Guntur
University of Hyderabad
Telugu people